Dick Riley (died 2010) was a New Hampshire gun shop owner, state senator and president of the National Rifle Association.

Riley opened a store, Riley's Sports Shop, in Manchester, New Hampshire in 1953 and later moved the store to Hooksett, New Hampshire. The store was sold to new owners in 1987 and again in 2014. In November 2019, it ceased operations.

References

2010 deaths
Year of birth missing
Presidents of the National Rifle Association
New Hampshire state senators